Robert Samuel Jones (1868–1939) was a Welsh footballer who played as a full back. He gained one international cap for Wales in 1894.

He joined Everton in December 1887. He was described as a burly, reliable reserve player in one source.  
Robert Jones made his League debut on 8 September 1888, playing at centre-half, at Anfield, the then home of Everton. The home team defeated the visitors Accrington 2–1. Robert Jones appeared in only one of the 22 League matches played by Everton in season 1888–89. Playing as a centre-half (one appearance) he played in the Everton defence when they restricted the opposition to one–League–goal–in–a–match once.

Robert Jones played 7 League games for Everton, before moving to Ardwick (who later became Manchester City) in the 1890s, and he played 18 League games for them.

References

1868 births
1939 deaths
Footballers from Wrexham
Welsh footballers
Wales international footballers
Association football fullbacks
English Football League players
Everton F.C. players
Manchester City F.C. players
Wrexham Grosvenor F.C. players